The ancient Egyptian Bone-with-meat hieroglyph (Gardiner F44)  represented: "ancestry, inherit", 
and phonetic isw, iw'  (inherit, etc.); a determinative for the femur, (iw'); and swt, for the tibia.

The Old Kingdom usage on slab steles, from the middle of the 3rd millennium BC, shows the proto-type form of the hieroglyph as a 'cut of meat', much like the spare ribs or beef ribs of the present era. The slab stela shows the bone as a multiple of two curved bones, much like the spare rib.

An example of a wall relief scene from Edfu at the Temple of Edfu shows a cartouche with the joint of meat hieroglyph. Another less common hieroglyph pictured within the cartouche is the vertical standing mummy hieroglyph.

See also
Gardiner's Sign List#F. Parts of Mammals
List of Egyptian hieroglyphs

References

Budge.  The Rosetta Stone, E.A.Wallace Budge, (Dover Publications), c 1929, Dover edition(unabridged), 1989. (softcover)
Kamrin, 2004. Ancient Egyptian Hieroglyphs: A Practical Guide, Janice Kamrin, c 2004, Harry N. Abrams, Publisher, (hardcover)

Egyptian hieroglyphs: parts of mammals